The Crucial Collection is a compilation album by Look Mexico, released on February 12, 2008 on Lujo Records. The disc re-releases the songs found on The Crucial EP (where the album's name is taken from) and the So Byzantine EP, and a selection of b-sides and remixes, as well as revised versions of songs taken from their debut, This Is Animal Music, with a more polished-sounding mix.

Track listing
"He Bit Me" – 1:28
"I Can't Today, I'm On Duty" – 2:56
"Call Off Your Lapdog" – 2:47
"Guys, I Need a Helicopter" – 4:45
"Come On, We Are Talking About You Here" – 2:59
"Whose Ship Is This?" – 4:12
"Oh, The Things I'm Gonna Do For My Country" – 5:7
"Variations On a Theme (Guys, I Need a Helicopter)" – 3:20
"Math Is Everywhere" – 3:42
"I Meant Pushups" – 3:32
"Me And My Dad Built Her" (remix) – 2:39
"You Ever Get Punched In the Face For Talking Too Much?" (History Invades remix) – 3:17
"You Come Into My House, While I Sleep?" (Chris Rucker remix) – 4:36
"Done And Done" (The Dark Romantics remix) – 3:53

External links
Amazon.com Item Listing
Official Band Site

Notes

Look Mexico albums
2008 compilation albums